S. Krishnamoorthy (born 19 October 1953) professionally known as Madhan Bob, is an Indian actor and comedian, appearing in many Tamil films in supporting roles. Madhan Babu is known for his amusing facial expressions, laughter and protruding eyeballs. He appeared in the popular Sun TV comedy show Asatha Povathu Yaaru? as one of the judges. Madhan Bob ventured into the film industry by donning the role of a musician.

Partial filmography

References

Tamil male actors
Living people
Tamil comedians
Indian male comedians
Indian male film actors
Television personalities from Tamil Nadu
1950 births